HMS Crane was a Royal Navy  launched in 1809. She had an unusually uneventful five-year career before she foundered in 1814.

She was commissioned in September 1809 under Cmdr. James Stuart for the Irish station. Stuart captured two American vessels, Asia of Boston and Washington of Marblehead, on their way home from Archangel. He brought the crews into Horta, in the Azores, and released them to John B. Dabney, the American consul, who repatriated them. It is not at all clear why Stuart had detained the Americans.

In August 1811 Commander William Haydon took temporary command and sailed her for the Leeward Islands on 29 September 1812. On 13 December 1812, she collided with the British merchant ship Robert Augustus, which was on a voyage from Barbados to Surinam; Robert Augustus sank without loss of life. Cranes next captain was Commander Thomas Forrest. In December 1813 Commander Robert Standly became her captain.

On 4 April 1814 Crane chased the American privateer Chasseur, of 14 guns and 135 men, off St Kitts, but was unable to capture her.

Crane was lost, presumed foundered with all hands, in September 1814 while en route from Bermuda to Canada.

Citations

References
 
 
 
 
 

Brig-sloops of the Royal Navy
1809 ships
Cruizer-class brig-sloops
Maritime incidents in 1812
Maritime incidents in 1814
Missing ships
Warships lost with all hands